Kevin Matthew McDonald is an American professional wrestler, He is best known for his time in Impact Wrestling, under the ring name KM. He is currently the promoter for WrestlePro and WrestlePro Alaska.

Professional wrestling career

Independent promotions and WWE appearance (2000–2014)
As a native of New York, Matthews wrestled in many promotions around New York City and New Jersey early in his career. In 2004 he wrestled for World Xtreme Wrestling in Pennsylvania teaming up with Greg Matthews. He was managed by Krissy Vaine. On June 14, 2005, Matthews wrestled as enhancement talent in his only appearance in WWE. He teamed with Nick Berk, losing to MNM (Joey Mercury and Johnny Nitro).

He also wrestled in Women Superstars Uncensored from 2006-2010. On December 12, 2009 Matthews lost to Tito Santana at NWS/WSU The Awesome Challenge in Flemington, New Jersey. Matthews spent most of his career performing for Pro Wrestling Syndicate. On May 8, 2010 Matthews defeated boxing legend Butterbean for the PWS Heavyweight Title. The title was vacated on August 20, 2010. He would regain the title by defeating Sami Callihan on June 2, 2012. On November 20, 2012 Matthews dropped the title to Matt Hardy. He would win the title back by defeating Hardy on February 9, 2013. During his reign he defeated Colt Cabana, Anthony Nese, and Homicide. He would drop the title to Alex Reynolds on September 20, 2013. On May 17, 2014 he defeated Jeff Jarrett.

Impact Wrestling (2017–2019)

On March 6, 2017, it was reported that McDonald had signed with Impact Wrestling. On the March 30 episode of Impact Wrestling, he debuted as Sienna's cousin, defeating Braxton Sutter with interference from Sienna, thus establishing himself as a heel. On the May 25 episode of Impact Wrestling, KM teamed with Kongo Kong defeating Braxton Sutter and Mahabali Shera, after both teams began a feud with each other. On the June 15 episode of Impact Wrestling that occurred in Mumbai, India, KM competed in a Gauntlet match for the inaugural Sony SIX Invitational Trophy, which was won by Mahabali Shera after KM was eliminated by Shera.

On July 2, during the Pre Show of Slammiversary XV, KM teamed with Kongo Kong and Laurel Van Ness losing to Mahabali Shera, Braxton Sutter, and Allie in a six-person tag team match. On the January 18, 2018, Impact Wrestling tapings, KM attacked James Storm with a beer bottle, smashing it over his head, after he joined the American Top Team.

KM then later formed an alliance with Fallah Bahh turning face in the process. In March 2019, his profile was moved to the alumni section of the Impact roster page on their website. Subsequently he stopped appearing on Impact Wrestling's weekly program.

Matthews would later argue with Impact Wrestling Executive Vice President Scott D'Amore on Twitter over the amount they pay their talent.

All Elite Wrestling (2021-2022) 
KM debuted on Monday, October 4, 2021 on an episode of AEW Dark: Elevation in a match against Sonny Kiss. On the May 11th, 2022 episode of AEW Dynamite, KM would appear as a security guard in a contract signing between MJF and Wardlow for a match at Double or Nothing. He would again appear on Elevation against John Silver on June 27, 2022. In Rochester, New York on July 6, he would return as a part of American Top Team with Dan Lambert, for the TNT Championship match between Scorpio Sky and Wardlow.

Championships and accomplishments
Impact Wrestling
Gravy Train Turkey Trot (2018) – with Fallah Bahh, Alisha Edwards, Kikutaro, Dezmond Xavier
''Pro Wrestling Illustrated
PWI ranked him #211 of the top 500 singles wrestlers in the PWI 500 in 2017
Pro Wrestling Syndicate
PWS Heavyweight Championship (3 times)
Stars & Stripes Championship Wrestling
SSCW Television Championship (1 time)
World Xtreme Wrestling
WXW Tag Team Championship (1 time) – with Greg Matthews
WrestlePro
UCE Championship (1 time)
WrestlePro Tag Team Championship (1 time) – with Fallah Bahh

References

External links

Impact Wrestling Profile
Internet Wrestling Database profile

1983 births
Living people
Sportspeople from Brooklyn
American male professional wrestlers
Professional wrestlers from New York (state)
21st-century professional wrestlers
Professional wrestlers from New York City